Shane Daly (born 19 December 1996) is an Irish rugby union player for United Rugby Championship and European Rugby Champions Cup side Munster and, internationally, for Ireland. He plays primarily as a wing or fullback, but has also played as a centre. Daly represents Cork Constitution in the All-Ireland League.

Early life
Born in Cork, Daly first began playing rugby for Highfield R.F.C. He attended Presentation Brothers College, Cork, where he played in the Munster Schools Rugby Senior Cup, though injury prevented him from breaking through at age grade until under-20 level, during which time he won an U20 inter-provincial title with Munster.

Cork Constitution
Daly was part of the Con team that won the All-Ireland League Division 1A, Munster Senior Cup and All-Ireland Cup during the 2016–17 season, as well as winning a second Senior Cup and All-Ireland League during the 2018–19 season. Con defended their Munster Senior Cup title during the 2019–20 season, defeating Young Munster 24–17 in the final, though Daly missed the match as he was with the senior Munster team for the inter-provincial clash against Connacht.

Munster
Daly made his debut for Munster A their 2017–18 British and Irish Cup win against Ospreys Premiership Select on 14 October 2017, with Daly starting on the left-wing in the 24–6 victory.

Daly was named in his first senior Munster match squad in April 2018, being selected on the bench for the provinces' 2017–18 Pro14 fixture against Ulster, though Daly was not used as a replacement during the 24–24 draw. Daly finally made his competitive debut for Munster on 1 September 2018, starting in the provinces' opening 2018–19 Pro14 fixture against Cheetahs in Thomond Park, a game which Munster won 38–0.

Daly signed a two-year contract with Munster in October 2018, a deal that saw Daly join the senior team from the 2019–20 season, and scored his first try for the province in their 37–28 away win against Italian side Benetton on 12 April 2019. In Munster's opening fixture of the 2019–20 Pro14 against Welsh side Dragons on 28 September 2019, Daly scored a try and earned the Man-of-the-Match award in the provinces 39–9 win. He made his European debut for the province in their 39–22 defeat away to French club Racing 92 in round 5 of the 2019–20 Champions Cup on 12 January 2020. Daly's performances were rewarded with a nomination for the Nevin Spence Young Player of the Year award at the 2020 Irish Rugby player awards in October 2020, and he won Munster's Young Player of the Year award for the 2019–20 season.

Daly signed a two-year contract extension with the province in February 2021, and extended that contract by a further two years in September 2022. Daly earned his 50th cap for Munster when he started in their 31–17 home win against South African side the Bulls in round five of the 2022–23 United Rugby Championship on 15 October 2022. He started and scored one try in Munster's historic 28–14 win against a South Africa XV in Páirc Uí Chaoimh on 10 November 2022.

Ireland
Daly represented Ireland under-20s during the 2016 Six Nations Under 20s Championship and 2016 World Rugby Under 20 Championship, starting every game and scoring two tries in the former, and scoring a try in the final of the latter as Ireland U20 finished the tournament as runners-up, their best ever result.

Daly has also represented Ireland 7s, where he played as a forward. He was selected in the squad for the 2017–18 season. He was a member of the Ireland squad that finished seventh at the 2018 Paris Sevens. He was also part of the squad that finished in ninth place and won the Challenge Trophy at the 2018 Rugby World Cup Sevens, beating Australia 24–14 in the final. He was included in the squads for the 2019 Paris Sevens and the 2019 Rugby Europe Sevens Olympic Qualifying Tournament.

Daly's form for Munster during the 2019–20 season was rewarded with his first senior call-up in October 2020 to the Ireland squad for the two delayed remaining fixtures of the 2020 Six Nations Championship. He made his debut for Ireland in their final Autumn Nations Cup pool fixture against Georgia on 29 November 2020, coming on as a replacement for provincial teammate Keith Earls in Ireland's 23–10 win.

Daly was selected in the Emerging Ireland squad that travelled to South Africa to participate in the Toyota Challenge against Currie Cup teams Free State Cheetahs, Griquas and Pumas in September–October 2022. He started and scored one try in Emerging Ireland's 54–7 opening win against Griquas on 30 September, featured as a replacement in the 28–24 win against the Pumas on 5 October, and started and scored one try again in the 21–14 win against the Cheetahs on 9 October.

Following the Toyota Challenge, Daly was also selected in the Ireland A panel that joined the senior Ireland team after round 7 of the 2022–23 United Rugby Championship to face an All Blacks XV on 4 November 2022; Daly featured as a replacement in Ireland A's 47–19 defeat.

Statistics

International analysis by opposition

Correct as of 3 July 2021

Honours

Cork Constitution
All-Ireland League Division 1A:
Winner (2): 2016–17, 2018–19
All-Ireland Cup:
Winner (1): 2016–17
Munster Senior Cup:
Winner (3): 2016–17, 2018–19, 2019–20

Individual
Munster Young Player of the Year:
Winner (1): 2019–20

References

External links
Ireland Profile
Munster Senior Profile
Munster Academy Profile
URC Profile

U20 Six Nations Profile

1996 births
Living people
People educated at Presentation Brothers College, Cork
Rugby union players from County Cork
Irish rugby union players
Cork Constitution players
Munster Rugby players
Ireland international rugby sevens players
Ireland international rugby union players
Ireland Wolfhounds international rugby union players
Rugby union centres
Rugby union wings
Rugby union fullbacks